The Übergossene Alm is the name of the summit region of the Hochkönig (2,941 m) in the Berchtesgaden Alps. It contains the remains of a glacier that used to cover almost the entire summit plateau; in 1888 around 5.5 km² of the plateau was covered by an ice sheet. Since then the glacial surface has melted until it now covers just 1.5 km² and the glacier has split into three, small crevasse-free areas. The name of the glacier goes back to a local legend.

High plateau and its perimeter mountains 
The Hochkönig is the southernmost and highest mountain block in the Berchtesgaden Alps. Unlike the Watzmann massif about 20 kilometres to the north, it has a plateau that tilts gently towards the north and covers about 15 km². Only in the south does it fall steeply away in rock faces up to 1,000 metres high (the Mandlwände).

The edge of the plateau is formed by several high two-thousanders in the shape of a giant oval. Apart from the main summit, the most prominent of the remaining peaks (in clockwise order) are the: Großer and Kleiner Bratschenkopf, Kummetstein, Lamkopf and Hochseiler (all over 2,850 m) and to the north/east to Tenneck, Floßkogel and the Schoberköpfe (2,435 to 2,710 m). To the east of the last-named is the imposing Torsäule, which the climb from the Arthurhaus hut runs past; the Torsäule marks the end of the plateau above the side valleys of the River Salzach.

Sources

External links 
 Legend of the Übergossene Alm 

Glaciers of Austria
Glaciers of the Alps
Berchtesgaden Alps
GUbergossene Alm